Bill Rangi Urale  is a New Zealand-Samoan hip-hop artist.

Music career
He was signed up as an artist with Festival Mushroom Records (NZ). In 2000 he released his critically acclaimed debut album Savage Thoughts, followed by a second album, 2nd Round Testament, released in New Zealand and Australia in 2003. Local sales for both albums hit the gold status mark. King Kapisi also achieved gold with his single U Can't Resist Us, featuring New Zealand hip hop icon Che Fu in 2003.

International acts
King Kapisi has performed alongside Afrika Bambaata, Janet Jackson, Moby, The Black Eyed Peas, Beastie Boys, Michael Franti and Spearhead, Red Hot Chili Peppers and many more. He has performed at almost every major music festival and event in New Zealand as well as tours to Australia, Japan, Fiji, Hawaii, Tonga, New York City, London, Toronto, Germany, Ireland, France and Norway.

In 2003, King Kapisi represented New Zealand at the Central Park birthday celebrations in New York City where he was also invited to play at the first old school hip hop reunion in Crotona Park, South Bronx. He played alongside legends such as The Furious Five, Cold Crush Brothers, Jazzy Jay and The Rocksteady Crew. King Kapisi was also given the opportunity to record a track with the legendary Kay Gee from the Cold Crush Brothers. The European leg of his 2003 overseas trip saw him perform a showcase at the international music conference POPKOMM in Cologne, Germany. He also spent time in Kaiserslautern, Germany recording with Germany-based American producer, Smitty K.

In 2004, Kapisi was invited by the German government as part of its new initiative scheme to promote cultural exchanges between New Zealand and Germany. Having supported German rap star MC Clueso in a New Zealand tour, Kapisi headed back to Germany to attend the POPKOMM music conference for a second time with Goethe-Institute playing host. Kapisi had the opportunity to record two tracks with German music producers Trickski and Slope from the Sonar Kollectiv record company. Kapisi also produced tracks for various local hip hop artists in Berlin, Amsterdam, Dublin, Toronto and Sydney.

Lyrics
King Kapisi's music and lyrics raise issues relevant to Pacific Island people living in New Zealand. He often challenges the role of Christianity and the church in contemporary Samoan society which is deeply devout. King Kapisi believes his music to be deeply connected to the culture of the Pacific people.

King Kapisi attempts to keep his music "real" by rapping about his Pacific heritage and the hip hop scene. He uses hip hop to promote the message of "keeping it real" through your culture, learning your language, and knowing "where you are from." Kapisi's lyrics and imagery have explored his complex post-Diaspora Pacific immigrant identity. He is a prime example of how New Zealand MC's are able to rap about their Diasporic identity in the text of their rap lyrics. Kapisi is now reaching out to the bigger global market. The transfer of Samoan hip hop identity to the US is something that already exists with artists who have settled and embraced their cultural heritage.

Samoa
King Kapisi is from Samoa and New Zealand. His extended family is from the island of Savaii. His family are from the villages of Fagamalo, Matavai & Faletagaloa, Falealupo and Safaatoa in Lefaga district.

Overstayer Label
In 2002, he started his own urban streetwear clothing label Overstayer Clothing. The name Overstayer refers to the infamous Dawn Raid era during the 1970s in New Zealand, when Pacific Islander overstayers were the prime target by the government using controversial means, even though the highest number of overstayers in the country at the time were Europeans. In 2003 and 2004, King Kapisi was awarded the Westfield Style Pasifika Designer Award giving the hip hop artist the opportunity to showcase his street label in the coveted international annual Air New Zealand Fashion Week in 2003. Overstayer Clothing was the first local street label to be sold in Farmers (department stores) in New Zealand.  The label is now available through selected outlets and his web store, The Plantation Store.

Discography

Albums

EPs

Singles

Honours and awards

|-
| 1999
| King Kapisi
| NZ Music Awards: Most Promising Male Vocalist
| 
|-
| 1999
| "Sub Cranium Feeling"
| NZ Music Awards: Best Music Video
| 
|-
| 1999
| King Kapisi
| bNet Music Awards: Male Fox
| 
|-
| 1999
| "Reverse Resistance"
| APRA Silver Scroll
| 
|-
| 2000
| "Reverse Resistance"
| bNet Music Awards: Best hip hop/reggae/dub release
| 
|-
| 2000
| "Reverse Resistance"
| bNet Music Awards: Best song
| 
|-
| 2001
| Savage Thoughts
| bNet Music Awards: Best Cover Art
| 
|-
| 2001
| "Screems from da Old Plantation"
| bNet Music Awards: Best Music Video
| 
|-
| 2001
| King Kapisi
| bNet Music Awards: Best Live Act
| 
|-
| 2001
| Savage Thoughts
| bNet Music Awards: Best Hip Hop Release
| 
|-
| 2001
| "Screems from da Old Plantation"
| bNet Music Awards: Best Song
| 
|-
| 2001
| Savage Thoughts
| bNet Music Awards: Best Album
| 
|-
| 2004
| 2nd Round Testament
| NZ Music Awards: Best Urban/Hip Hop Album
| 
|-
| 2006
| Dominant Species
| Pacific Music Awards: Best Pacific Male Artist
| 
|-
| 2006
| Dominant Species
| Pacific Music Awards: Best Pacific Urban Artist
| 
|-
| 2014
| "Crush"
| Pacific Music Awards: Best Pacific Music Video
| 
|-
| 2014
| "Crush"
| Pacific Music Awards: Best Pacific Urban Artist
| 
|-
| 2015
| "Welcome Back"
| Pacific Music Awards: Best Pacific Male Artist
| 
|-
|}

In the 2022 Queen's Birthday and Platinum Jubilee Honours, Urale was appointed a  Member of the New Zealand Order of Merit, for services to music and the community.

References

External links
King Kapisi (official website)
Facebook
Twitter
Myspace

APRA Award winners
New Zealand rappers
New Zealand people of Samoan descent
Samoan artists
Living people
1974 births
People educated at Wellington High School, New Zealand
Members of the New Zealand Order of Merit